The Toronto School of Art is an independent non-profit art school in Toronto teaching painting, drawing,  sculpture, photography, and digital arts. 

After fifty years of operating out of rental facilities, the school acquired ownership of a building at 24 Ryerson Avenue in Downtown Toronto and has been located there since 2019.

The school was founded in 1969 as Art School Toronto and prides itself as being operated "by artists, for artists."

It does not offer degree programs but has offered a fine art diploma  and certificate programs as well as portfolio and professional development programs.

The school went bankrupt on 2012 and faced closure but was able to reopen, restructure, and eventually but its own facilities due to the support of benefactors. In 2019, enrollment surpassed 1,500 students, up from 500 in 2012.

References

External links
Toronto School of Art

Art schools in Canada
Educational institutions established in 1969
Education in Toronto